Modesta is a 1956 film set in Puerto Rico.

Modesta may also refer to:

Surname
 Viktoria Modesta (born 1988), Latvian–British singer and performance artist
 Wilman Modesta (born 1995), Dominican footballer

Given name
 Modesta Vžesniauskaitė (born 1983), Lithuanian cyclist
 Moderata Fonte (1555–1592), Venetian writer and poet
 Modesta Avila (c.1867–1891), protester, first woman felon in Orange County, California
 Modesta Justė Morauskaitė (born 1995), Lithuanian sprinter and snowboarder
 Modesta Bor (1926–1998), Venezuelan composer
 Modesta Uka (born 1999), Kosovar footballer
 Modesta Sanginés Uriarte (1832–1887), Bolivian composer
 Modesta Lavana (1929–2010), Nahua healer from Morelos, Mexico